The Sideshow is a 1928 American silent drama film directed by Erle C. Kenton and starring Marie Prevost, Ralph Graves, and Alan Roscoe.

Synopsis
A circus is threatened by acts of sabotage organized by a rival company.

Cast

Preservation status
Prints of The Sideshow exist at the French archive Centre national du cinéma et de l'image animée in Fort de Bois-d'Arcy and the UCLA Film and Television Archive.

References

Bibliography
 Munden, Kenneth White. The American Film Institute Catalog of Motion Pictures Produced in the United States, Part 1. University of California Press, 1997.

External links

1928 films
1928 drama films
Silent American drama films
Films directed by Erle C. Kenton
American silent feature films
1920s English-language films
Columbia Pictures films
American black-and-white films
1920s American films